Cadherin-15 is a protein that in humans is encoded by the CDH15 gene.

Function 

This gene is a member of the cadherin superfamily of genes, encoding calcium-dependent intercellular adhesion glycoproteins. Cadherins consist of an extracellular domain containing 5 cadherin domains, a transmembrane region, and a conserved cytoplasmic domain. Transcripts from this particular cadherin are expressed in myoblasts and upregulated in myotubule-forming cells. The protein is thought to be essential for the control of morphogenetic processes, specifically myogenesis, and may provide a trigger for terminal muscle cell differentiation.

Interactions 

CDH15 has been shown to interact with ARVCF.

References

Further reading

External links